This is a list of properties and districts in Telfair County, Georgia that are listed on the National Register of Historic Places (NRHP).

Current listings

|}

References

Telfair
Telfair County, Georgia